This is a list of Nova Scotian mammals.

Bats (Chiroptera) 

 Little brown bat (Myotis lucifugus)
 Hoary bat (Lasiurus cinereus)
 Red bat (Lasiurus borealis)
 Northern long-eared bat (Myotis septentrionalis)
 Big brown bat (Eptesicus fuscus)
 Tricolored bat (Perimyotis subflavus)
 Silver-haired bat (Lasionycteris noctivagans)

Carnivores (Carnivora)

Canines (Canidae) 

 Coyote (Canis latrans ssp.)
 Grey wolf (Canis lupus) extirpated
 Red fox (Vulpes vulpes)

Bears (Ursidae) 

 Black bear (Ursus americanus)

Raccoons (Procyonidae) 

 Raccoon (Procyon lotor)

Mustelids (Mustelidae) 
 River otter (Lontra canadensis)
 American marten (Martes americana)
 American mink (Neogale vison)
American ermine (Mustela richardsonii)
 Fisher (Pekania pennanti)

Skunks (Mephitidae) 

 Striped skunk (Mephitis mephitis)

Felines (Felidae) 
 Eastern cougar (Puma concolor couguar) extirpated, but sightings continue.
 Canada lynx (Lynx canadensis)
 Bobcat (Lynx rufus)

Earless seals (Phocidae) 

 Harbor seal (Phoca vitulina)
 Harp seal (Pagophilus groenlandicus)
 Hooded seal (Cystophora cristata)
 Grey seal (Halichoerus grypus)
 Ringed seal (Pusa hispida)

Walruses (Otariidae) 

 Walrus (Odobenus rosmarus) extirpated

Even-toed ungulates (Artiodactyla)

Deer (Cervidae) 

 White-tailed deer (Odocoileus virginianus) introduced
 Moose (Alces alces)
 Caribou (Rangifer tarandus) extirpated

Whales (Cetacea)

Oceanic dolphins (Delphinidae) 

 Short-beaked common dolphin (Delphinus delphis)
 Short-finned pilot whale (Globicephala macrorhynchus)
 Risso's dolphin (Grampus griseus)
 Orca (Orcinus orca)
 Striped dolphin (Stenella coeruleoalba)

References 

Mammals
Nova Scotia